El Camino (Spanish for "the road", "the way", "the path") may refer to:

Places
 El Camino, California, a community in the United States
 El Camino College, a community college in Los Angeles County, California
 El Camino Hospital, a hospital in Mountain View, California

Music
 El Camino (Adriana Evans album), a 2007 album by Adriana Evans
 El Camino (The Black Keys album), a 2011 album by the band The Black Keys
 El Camino (Vox Dei album), a 2005 album by Vox Dei
 "El Camino", a song from Ween's album GodWeenSatan: The Oneness (1990)

Other uses
 Chevrolet El Camino, a coupé utility vehicle produced by General Motors from 1959 to 1960 and 1964 to 1987
 El Camino (train), a train owned by Los Angeles County
 El Camino: A Breaking Bad Movie (2019), a Breaking Bad sequel television film with a limited theatrical release

See also

 El (disambiguation)
 Camino (disambiguation)
 El Camino Real (disambiguation), various roads in California, Mexico, Spain, and elsewhere